The Crime Intelligence Division of the South African Police Service is an intelligence agency that tracks criminal elements within the Republic of South Africa. It is run by a Divisional Commissioner, who is also a member of the National Intelligence Co-Ordinating Committee (NICOC), to which they report.

The main functions of the CI division are:
 Operational Support.
 Crime Information Analysis Centre.
 Crime Information Management Centre.
 Counter Intelligence.
 Covert Intelligence.
 Crime Intelligence Collection.

South African intelligence agencies
Law enforcement in South Africa
Criminal records